Hands Up! is a 2003 Chinese historical comedy film directed and written by Feng Xiaoning, and produced by Han Sanping. The film stars Pan Changjiang, Guo Da, and Liu Wei. It based on the Second Sino-Japanese War.

Cast
 Pan Changjiang as the Imperial Japanese Army officer.
 Guo Da as Uncle Guo, a Chinese farmer and underground traffic policeman.
 Liu Wei as "Me"/ Mother/ Grandmother. The narrator of the film.

Others
 Hu Xiaoguang as The Tycoon.
 Li Ming as The interpreter of the Tycoon
 Bao De as the captain of Eighth Route Army.
 Zhang Xiaoning as an Imperial Japanese Army soldier.
 Li Baoguo as an Imperial Japanese Army soldier.
 Zheng Jie as an Imperial Japanese Army soldier.
 Gang Qiang as an Imperial Japanese Army soldier.
 Liu Damao as a Chinese kid.
 Liu Ermao as a Chinese kid.

Production
The film took place in Panyan Park of Xinxiang city, Henan province.

References

External links
 
 

2000s war comedy films
2000s Mandarin-language films
Chinese war comedy films
Second Sino-Japanese War films
Films shot in Henan
Films directed by Feng Xiaoning
2003 comedy films
2003 films